Baby, I'm Back (stylized onscreen as Baby... I'm Back!) is an American sitcom television series that aired on CBS in early 1978. The series stars Demond Wilson, Denise Nicholas, Helen Martin and Kim Fields.

Synopsis
Raymond Ellis is a compulsive gambler who abandoned his family (wife Olivia, son Jordan and daughter Angie) and headed to California. Seven years later while in California, Ray finds out that his wife plans to remarry to Colonel Wallace Dickey, and that he has been declared legally dead. This prompts him to move back to Washington, D.C., where he tries to win back Olivia by proving he is a better husband, and a better father to his kids, and to prove that he is still alive. However, he now has to contend with his mother-in-law Luzelle and Olivia's soon-to-be husband Colonel Wallace Dickey.

Production
The pilot was videotaped in September 1977. CBS picked the pilot up as a mid-season replacement, going into production at the CBS Studio Center lot in November 1977, for airing from January to April 1978.

In the book Funny You Should Ask: Oral Histories of Classic Sitcom Storytellers by Scott Lewellen, Garrett created the show to address the social issue of the time of black males not being able to get jobs to provide for their families. Many had abandoned their families because of it and in this case, the lead character did abandon his family, but once he found work and got his act together, he came back, hence the name of the show. In the show, the mother had a great government job at the Pentagon and lived in a nice apartment. At the time of casting Wilson had just completed Sanford and Son and Nicholas was a hot commodity. Garrett saw the chemistry between the two. Nicholas said in a summer 1978 edition of Jet Magazine that she was surprised at the cancellation of the series despite decent ratings.

Garrett stated the show was cancelled due to Norman Lear wanting Good Times to come back for another season and told CBS that he would create them another show in exchange for it.

Cast
 Demond Wilson as Raymond Ellis
 Denise Nicholas as Olivia Ellis
 Tony Holmes as Jordan Ellis
 Kim Fields as Angie Ellis
 Helen Martin as Luzelle Carter
 Ed Hall as Colonel Wallace Dickey

Episodes

Syndication
Reruns aired occasionally on Black Entertainment Television in the late 1980s and early 1990s.

References

External links

1978 American television series debuts
1978 American television series endings
1970s American black sitcoms
1970s American sitcoms
CBS original programming
English-language television shows
Television shows set in Washington, D.C.
Television series by MGM Television